Petr Čáslava (born 3 September 1979) is a Czech professional ice hockey defenceman currently playing for HC Pardubice of the Czech Extraliga.

Playing career
Čáslava spent the majority of his career with HC Pardubice of the Czech Extraliga. He also played in Russia for Severstal Cherepovets for the 2007-08 Russian Superleague season before returning to Pardubice and in Sweden for Timrå IK for the 2009-10 Elitserien season before moving back to Russia for CSKA Moscow.

International play

Čáslava has played for the Czech Republic national ice hockey team.  He played his first game in the national squad in 2002, and has played 53 times for the national team (as of Jan 3 2009), and played in the 2007 World Championship and 2008 World Championship.

References

External links

 Petr Čáslava at the official page of HC Pardubice

1979 births
Czech ice hockey defencemen
Czech expatriate ice hockey players in Russia
HC CSKA Moscow players
HC Dynamo Pardubice players
Severstal Cherepovets players
Living people
Timrå IK players
Sportspeople from Kolín
Czech expatriate ice hockey players in Sweden